The 1981–82 Buffalo Sabres season was the Sabres' 12th season of operation for the National Hockey League franchise that was established on May 22, 1970.

Offseason

Regular season

Final standings

Schedule and results

Playoffs
The Sabres lost to the Boston Bruins three games to one, in the Adams Division semi-finals.

Player statistics

Awards and records

Transactions

Draft picks
Buffalo's draft picks at the 1981 NHL Entry Draft held at the Montreal Forum in Montreal, Quebec.

Farm teams

See also
1981–82 NHL season

References

Buffalo Sabres seasons
Buffalo
Buffalo
Buffalo Sabres
Buffalo Sabres